Simone Taraivosa Nalatu (born 21 March 1980 in , Queensland, Australia) is a Fijian Australian netball player.

Biography
Naltu commenced competing, aged eight years; and was a member of the Fijian national team that played at the 2007 Netball World Championships.

Nalatu studied at Griffith University and completed her PhD in 2012, studying the physical activity patterns of Aboriginal mothers and the factors that influence participation.

She also played for the Queensland Firebirds in the Commonwealth Bank Trophy from 2004–07. In 2008 and 2009 Nalatu was selected for the Queensland Fusion in the inaugural Australian Netball League where she captained the side. Nalatu plays for the Suncoast Lynx in the Holden Cruze Cup (the Queensland State League).

References

1980 births
Living people
Australian netball players
Fijian netball players
Australian people of I-Taukei Fijian descent
Netball players from Queensland
Griffith University alumni
Australian Netball League players
Queensland Fusion players
Queensland Firebirds players
Commonwealth Bank Trophy players
2011 World Netball Championships players
Queensland state netball league players